Henry Franklin Lawrence Jr. (December 22, 1897 – August 7, 1970) was an American football and basketball coach. He served as the head football coach at McKendree College—now known as McKendree University—in Lebanon, Illinois in 1920 and at Northwest Missouri State Teacher's College—now known as Northwest Missouri State University—in Maryville, Missouri from 1923 to 1926, compiling career college football coaching record of 23–9–3. Lawrence was also the head basketball coach at McKendree in 1920–21 and at Northwest Missouri State from 1923 to 1929, tallying a career college basketball coaching mark of 68–47.

Lawrence attended Missouri Wesleyan College in Cameron, Missouri, where he played he played football, basketball, and tennis and was a member of the track. Prior to being appointed athletic director and coach at Northwest Missouri State in 1923, he held the same position at Maryville High School.

Lawrence was the son of U. S. Representative Henry F. Lawrence.

Head coaching record

College football

References

1897 births
1970 deaths
McKendree Bearcats football coaches
McKendree Bearcats men's basketball coaches
Missouri Wesleyan Owls football players
Northwest Missouri State Bearcats athletic directors
Northwest Missouri State Bearcats football coaches
Northwest Missouri State Bearcats men's basketball coaches
College men's tennis players in the United States
College men's track and field athletes in the United States
High school basketball coaches in Missouri
High school football coaches in Missouri
People from Gallatin, Missouri
Coaches of American football from Missouri
Players of American football from Missouri
Basketball coaches from Missouri
Basketball players from Missouri
Tennis people from Missouri
Track and field athletes from Missouri